Seby may refer to:

People
 Seby B. Jones (1915–2002), American politician
 Seby Zavala (born 1993), American baseball player

Places
 Seby, Öland, Sweden
 Séby, France